Casanova '73 is a British sitcom broadcast on BBC1 in September and October 1973. Written by Ray Galton and Alan Simpson, the series starred Leslie Phillips as wealthy womaniser Henry Newhouse (the English translation of "casa nova").

Background and plot
Casanova '73 followed an episode of Galton and Simpson Comedy ("The Suit", 1969) for London Weekend Television in which Phillips played Howard Butler, a philandering businessman whose clothes are stolen whilst he is in bed at his secretary's home. As with this series, it also featured Jan Holden as his wife. Casanova '73 was specially written for Phillips.

Henry Newhouse has a successful career in public relations. Although happily married to Carol, he is a compulsive philanderer and leads a double life. His relationships invariably backfire and lead to farcical situations.

Cast
Leslie Phillips – Henry Newhouse
Jan Holden – Carol Newhouse
Yolande Turner – Connie Langham
Elvi Hale – Muriel 
Cyd Hayman – Miss Dropmore
Madeline Smith – Tessa Finlay
Josephine Tewson – Mrs Kershaw
Ronald Adam – Dr Spartforth
Astrid Frank – Miss West Germany
Maureen Lipman – Gloria 
Michael Knowles – Judge
Janet Davies – Wife
Directed and Produced by Harold Snoad

Reception
Casanova '73 was poorly received by the critics. Stanley Reynolds in The Times wrote that Phillips character "gets caught in the wrong beds in all the right comic places but it still does not seem to work. The script is either too laborious and slow or the jokes are too old and feeble." Mary Whitehouse, of the National Viewers' and Listeners' Association and others objected to its risque contents. The complaints led to the programme being moved to a later time slot. The first three episodes aired at 8.00pm on Thursdays and the final four on Mondays at 9.25pm. The quiz show Mastermind replaced it in the slot, helping it to become a hit.

Episodes

DVD releases
All seven episodes of Casanova '73 were released on DVD by Acorn Media UK on 8 October 2012.

References
General

Specific

1973 British television series debuts
1973 British television series endings
1970s British sitcoms
Adultery in television
BBC television sitcoms
Beauty pageants in fiction
English-language television shows
Television series created by Ray Galton
Television series created by Alan Simpson